Chaseley was a sailing ship.

The Chaseleys captain was C. F. Aldridge and its medical superintendent was William Hobbs. The Chaseley departed The Downs on 27 December 1848 and arrived in Moreton Bay on 1 May 1849.

Notable immigrants on Chaseley
 John Lloyd Bale, banker and politician of Brisbane
 Benjamin Cribb, businessman and politician of Ipswich
George Grimes, farmer and member of the Queensland Legislative Assembly
Samuel Grimes, farmer and member of the Queensland Legislative Assembly
 Mary McConnel, founder of the Royal Children's Hospital, Brisbane

References

1845 ships
Ships built on the River Wear
History of immigration to Australia
Sailing ships of the United Kingdom
History of Queensland
Pre-Separation Queensland